Xinxing may refer to:

Taiwan
Sinsing District, Kaohsiung

Mainland China
Xinxing County (新兴县), of Yunfu, Guangdong
Xinxing District, Qitaihe (新兴区), Heilongjiang
Xinxing Township (disambiguation) (新兴乡), for all townships named Xinxing
Xinxing, Xinjiang (新星市), a county-level city in Xinjiang

Subdistricts (新兴街道)
Xinxing Subdistrict, Jieyang, in Rongcheng District, Jieyang, Guangdong
Xinxing Subdistrict, Zhanjiang, in Xiashan District, Zhanjiang, Guangdong
Xinxing Subdistrict, Anda
Xinxing Subdistrict, Mudanjiang, in Yangming District, Mudanjiang, Heilongjiang
Xinxing Subdistrict, Qiqihar, in Ang'angxi District, Qiqihar, Heilongjiang
Xinxing Subdistrict, Yichun, Heilongjiang, in Xilin District, Yichun, Heilongjiang
Xinxing Subdistrict, Xuchang, in Weidu District, Xuchang, Henan
Xinxing Subdistrict, Liaoyuan, in Longshan District, Liaoyuan, Jilin
Xinxing Subdistrict, Yanji, Jilin
Xinxing Subdistrict, Donggang, Liaoning
Xinxing Subdistrict, Fuxin, in Haizhou District, Fuxin, Liaoning
Xinxing Subdistrict, Shenyang, in Heping District, Shenyang, Liaoning
Xinxing Subdistrict, Yingkou, in Zhanqian District, Yingkou, Liaoning
Xinxing Subdistrict, Xi'an, in Yanliang District, Xi'an, Shaanxi
Xinxing Subdistrict, Xianyang, in Weicheng District, Xianyang, Shaanxi
Xinxing Subdistrict, Jiaxing, in Nanhu District, Jiaxing, Zhejiang
Xinxing Subdistrict, Tianjin, in Heping District, Tianjin
Xinxing Subdistrict, Harbin, in Shuangcheng District, Harbin

Towns
Written as "辛兴镇":
Xinxing, Li County, Hebei
Xinxing, Zhucheng, Shandong

Written as "新兴镇":
Xinxing, Woyang County, Anhui
Xinxing, Qing County, Hebei
Xinxing, Gangu County, Gansu
Xinxing, Tunchang County, Hainan
Xinxing, Yancheng, in Tinghu District, Yancheng, Jiangsu
Xinxing, Heishan County, Liaoning
Xinxing, Dawa County, Liaoning
Xinxing, Sanyuan County, Shaanxi
Xinxing, Cangshan County, Shandong
Xinxing, Shuangliu County, Sichuan
Xinxing, Pengzhou, Sichuan